Classic Car Rescue is a British/Canadian reality television series produced by Blink Films and aired on Channel 5 for six weeks in 2012, as well as on Discovery Networks affiliates in international markets.

Each one-hour episode documents the work of Cockney mechanic Bernie Fineman and his Italian Canadian business partner Mario Pacione, as they purchase "shameful rust bucket" classic cars from scrapheaps, barns, and backyards and restore them to their former, or to new, glories. Having bought the "bargain wrecks," the pair must then source the parts needed to return the cars to the shiny, desirable motors they once were. At the end of each episode, the cars are appraised by an automotive valuer before being given away in a viewer competition. The programme returned with a second series in 2014, running for eight weeks.

Episodes

Series 1

Series 2

Reception 
James Ruppert of Autocar wrote a scathing review on the TV series, criticising Fineman as a "big fat bully making a drama out of a manufactured crisis."

References

External links 

Official site on Channel 5
Official site on Discovery World
Official site at Blink Films

2010s British reality television series
2010s Canadian reality television series
2012 British television series debuts
2014 British television series endings
2012 Canadian television series debuts
2014 Canadian television series endings
Automotive television series
Conservation and restoration of vehicles